Jacques Rouxel may refer to:

 Jacques Rouxel (animator) (1931–2004), French animator
 Jacques Rouxel (production designer), French production designer